Anne Helm (born September 12, 1938) is a retired Canadian-born actress and children's author (as Annie Helm), who primarily appeared in guest roles on episodes of various American television series. Her few film roles include playing Elvis Presley's love interest in the 1962 film Follow That Dream. Helm had two recurring roles, playing Molly Pierce in five episodes during the 85-episode run of the mid-1960s series Run for Your Life and playing the minor role of nurse Mary Briggs in an unknown number of episodes of the daily soap opera General Hospital from 1971 to 1973.

Early years
Helm was born in Toronto, Canada, and grew up in Ste. Marguerite, a hamlet. Her father was a broker of real estate, and her mother operated a country inn and dairy farm. She began studying ballet with the National Ballet Guild of Canada when she was 12, and at 14 she studied at the Metropolitan Opera Ballet School.

Career 
Helm began performing on Broadway in the 1940s as she danced in High Kickers (1941), Lady in the Dark (1943), and Mexican Hayride (1944). 
She returned as an actress, portraying Sally Reece in Cloud 7 (1958) and Edwina Booth in Edwin Booth (1958). During the 1950s, she modeled clothing for teenage girls in New York, made commercials and danced at the Copacabana night club.

Living in New York City, Helm began her pursuit of an acting career, which eventually led to Hollywood. Beginning in the 1950s, she made guest appearances on television series. Her television debut occurred on The Phil Silvers Show in the role of a contestant in a beauty pageant. Her 1958 title role in Shirley Temple's Storybook'''s presentation of "The Sleeping Beauty" was the subject of an article in Life magazine. She made her motion picture debut in 1960.

Helm was cast as Linda Moon in the 1960 episode "A Thief or Two" on CBS's anthology series, The DuPont Show with June Allyson, with co-star Lew Ayres. She appeared on the CBS western series Rawhide in the episodes "Incident Near Gloomy River (1961) and "Inside Man" (1962). She guest-starred in an episode of the CBS sitcom My Sister Eileen, with Elaine Stritch and Shirley Bonne.

In 1961, Helm appeared in an episode of Alfred Hitchcock Presents ("The Changing Heart", Series 6, episode 14/205, airdate January 3, 1961). Alfred Hitchcock Presents The Big Kick, Season 7 episode 37. She guest-starred in the premiere episode of ABC's Bus Stop drama series. That same year, she appeared in the first season of CBS's Route 66 in the episode "The Clover Throne", and in the syndicated crime drama The Brothers Brannagan in the episode "Equinox." She also played Glamis Barlow, the title character, in the Perry Mason TV episode, "The Case of the Duplicate Daughter."  In Dec 1961 she appeared in The Untouchables episode 3–8, "Mankiller".  
Helm was cast as Jennie Metcalf, the daughter of an outlaw who seeks vengeance for her father's death, in the 1962 episode "Girl with a Gun", on the syndicated anthology series, Death Valley Days.Helm drew national recognition as Holly Jones, the love interest of Elvis Presley in his 1962 film Follow That Dream. She made five more films during the 1960s including The Iron Maiden (released in the US as Swinging Maiden), a 1962 British made comedy film, The Interns (1962), Honeymoon Hotel (1964), The Unkissed Bride (1966), and the horror film Nightmare in Wax (1969).

Helm played different roles in three appearances on Wagon Train, an American Western series. The first episode Helm was on was entitled "The Dick Pederson Story" (10 Jan. 1962); the second episode was entitled "Heather and Hamish" (10 Apr. 1963) and the third was "The Story of Cain" (16 Dec. 1963).

On January 15, 1963, Helm guest-starred in the episode "Protective Custody" of NBC's Laramie western series. David Brian played Walt Douglas, an official of the stage line, who arrives in Laramie seeking his estranged daughter, Alicia, portrayed by Helm.

In the Gunsmoke TV Series she played "Helena Dales"  in "One Killer on Ice", and "Trudy Trent" in "Bad Seed".

Later in 1963, she was cast as Joanie in the series finale, "The Convention," of the modern western series, Empire.

In 1963 she also guest-starred as Janie in Season-three of CBS's TV series Route 66 in the episode: "Narcissus On An Old Red Fire Engine".

Helm appeared in The Magic Sword (1962) opposite Basil Rathbone and Gary Lockwood. She was originally cast to play Joan Crawford's daughter Carol in William Castle's Strait-Jacket (1964) but was replaced.

Helm appeared as Nora Martin in a 1964 episode of The Fugitive titled "Ballad for a Ghost", and again in a 1964 episode  of 'Burke's Law' - 'Who Killed 1/2 Of Glory Lee?' -  as Sable Delacroix.

Helm had the role of Amy in the ABC drama The Long, Hot Summer (1965-1966). She also appeared in two episodes of the ABC western series The Big Valley, both times in a role that interacted prominently with main cast member Lee Majors. Her first appearance was on October 20, 1965, in the first-season episode "Heritage"  in the role of Brydie Hanrahan. Helm then returned on March 4, 1968, in the third season in the episode entitled "The Devil's Masquerade," playing the role of Nancy.

In 1967 she appeared as Jeanne Springer in Season 3 Episode 16 "Long Time Dead" of Twelve O'Clock High.

Helms' appearance on The F.B.I. in 1968 was her third on that series in three years. In 1968, Helm appeared as Irene Park in Season 1 of Hawaii Five-O.

In 1968 appeared in the chapter 32 of the season 9 as a teacher in the tv Series Bonanza. In 1969 she appeared as Karen Mallory on the TV Series The Virginian in the episode titled "Journey to Scathelock."

From 1971 to 1973, Helm was a regular cast member on the ABC soap opera General Hospital.

In 1986, Helm appeared in the episode  "The Doll", on Steven Spielberg's dramatic television anthology, Amazing Stories.

 Author 
After her acting career ended in 1986, Helm started writing children's books, as Annie Helm. Her book The Sunshine Angel Book for Angel Workers of All Ages was published in 1992, followed in 1993 by The Little Angel Workbook for Children of all Ages. Fifteen years later, in 2018, her book Babystar was published.

 Personal life 
Anne Helm was married from 1968 to 1969 to author John Sherlock, with whom she had a son, Peter Sherlock. Her second husband was actor Robert Viharo, whom she wed in 1971 and had a daughter, Serena Viharo (born 1977), who also became an actress. Helm and Viharo divorced in 1979.

 Select filmography 
 Tales of Wells Fargo 1960, Season 5, Episode 9
 Sea Hunt 1960, Season 3, Episode 29
 Route 66 1961, Season 1, Episode 15
 Rawhide 1961, Season 4, Episode 6
 Perry Mason 1961, Season 4, Episode 26 "The Case of the Duplicate Daughter"
 The Iron Maiden -  (1962)  as Kathy Fisher - (US: 'The Swinging Maiden')
 Follow that Dream 1962 movie
 Laramie 1963, Season 4, Episode 15
 The Big Valley (2 episodes):  1965, Season 1, Episode 6 ("Heritage"); 1968, Season 3, Episode 24 ("The Devil's Masquerade")
 Bonanza (2 episodes):  1965, Season 7, Episode 8 ("The Meredith Smith"); 1968, Season 9, Episode 32 ("Pride of a Man")
 The F.B.I. 1968, Season 4, Episode 11
 Wagon Train, The Story of Cain 1963 (Ruth Cain)
 Hawaii Five-O''

References

External links
 
 The Private Life and Times of Anne Helm

1938 births
Living people
American film actresses
American television actresses
American children's writers
Canadian emigrants to the United States
Canadian film actresses
Canadian television actresses
Actresses from Toronto
People from Greater Los Angeles
20th-century American actresses
Writers from Toronto
21st-century American women